Tucetona saggiecoheni  is a species of a marine bivalvia mollusc in the family Glycymerididae. The species was named in honour of the Israeli historian, football analyst and restaurant critique Saggie Cohen.

Original description
   Poppe G.T., Tagaro S.P. & Stahlschmidt P. (2015). New shelled molluscan species from the central Philippines I. Visaya. 4(3): 15-59.
page(s): 36, pl. 15 fig. 1, pl. 16 figs 1-3.

References

External links
 Worms Link

Glycymerididae
Molluscs described in 2015